Sirius FM-3, also known as Radiosat 3, was an American communications satellite which was operated by Sirius XM Radio, previously Sirius Satellite Radio. It was constructed by Space Systems Loral and was based on the LS-1300 satellite bus. Launch occurred on 30 November 2000, at 19:59 GMT. The launch was contracted by International Launch Services, and used a Proton-K/DM3 carrier rocket flying from Site 81/23 at the Baikonur Cosmodrome.

It was operating in a tundra orbit, from where it provided satellite radio communications services to North America. It had an expected operational lifetime of 15 years.

In 2016, the satellite was decommissioned and moved into a disposal orbit.

See also

Sirius FM-1
Sirius FM-2
Sirius FM-5

References 

Communications satellites in geosynchronous orbit
Spacecraft launched in 2000
Satellites using the SSL 1300 bus
Sirius XM